The Junior State of America (formerly the Junior Statesmen of America), abbreviated JSA, is an American non-partisan youth organization. The purpose of JSA is to help high school students acquire leadership skills and the knowledge necessary to be effective debaters and civic participants. JSA is sponsored by the Junior State of America Foundation Inc. (JSAF, a 501c(3) non-profit corporation), which also operates the JSA Summer Schools. The Junior State of America is student-run, the largest such organization in the United States.

Overview 

Students organize every aspect of the organization, from the local chapter level to the regional level. The members elect local, regional, and state leaders to organize JSA conventions, conferences, and political awareness events.

JSA is both a local and a national organization. JSA is organized by regions, somewhat congruous with the real geographic United States regions. At the high school chapter level, chapter presidents organize local activities and meetings. On the regional level, mayors and vice mayors organize regional one-day conferences. On the state level, governors and lieutenant governors organize overnight conventions and other activities. On the national level, governors are in communication with each other planning convention themes and steering the direction of the organization.

The JSA program includes debates, "thought talks," problem solving, and a variety of simulations designed to provide members with an informed viewpoint and the ability to analyse important issues. Simulations include, for example, Model United Nations, Model Congress (with a Senate and House of Representatives), crisis simulations, and other activities. JSA provides an opportunity to meet other students from outside their home communities who share similar interests; furthermore, debate conventions usually include various evening activities like dining downtown or impromptu debate.

In addition to sponsoring the JSA, the JSAF sponsors three- and four-week Summer School sessions for JSA members and other high school students. These are held at Stanford and Georgetown, and week-long symposium on state and local politics are held in several states. (In years past, JSF has held Summer School sessions at Yale, Northwestern University, University of Texas at Austin, University of California, Davis, University of California, Santa Cruz, and Princeton). Sessions include college-level courses on political science, economics, history and public speaking. Students from all over the world, (most notably England, France, Turkey, Micronesia, the U.S. Virgin Islands and Hong Kong) attend Summer School. The revenue from these programs help fund the school-year JSA program.

History 
JSA was founded in 1934 by Professor E. A. Rogers at the Montezuma Mountain School in Los Gatos, California, as an experiment in self-government. Students at the Montezuma Mountain School set up their own three-branch government, complete with a student court, police force, executive officer, and legislative branch. The students would draft, pass, and enforce their own rules.

The JSA has had liaisons with other similar organizations outside of the United States. For example, throughout the 1980s the Pacific-Northwest State developed close ties with the British Columbia Youth Parliament (BCYP). "Ambassadors" were invited from the Pacific-Northwest State to attend the December BCYP legislative session in Victoria, British Columbia, as well a number of BCYP sponsored events, including the "Vernon Conference" held in 1985, a project to celebrate the United Nations International Year of the Youth, involving the BCYP, the TUXIS Parliament of Alberta, and the JSA. In turn, the BCYP would send delegates to attend Pacific-Northwest Spring and Fall State. The Southern California state also added the American School in Honduras as a chapter in 2006 and the school's chapter attended the annual Congress convention. There are two active chapters in St. Kitts and St. Thomas, USVI. Puerto Rico has traditionally one or two chapters. All Caribbean chapters attend either the Northeast State or Mid-Atlantic State conventions.

Since its inception in 1934, more than 500,000 student members have participated in the JSA.

Notable alumni 
Notable former members include Leon Panetta (Former Secretary of Defense, Director of the Central Intelligence Agency, White House Chief of Staff, United States Congressman, and Member of the California State Senate), Mike McCurry (Press Secretary under President Bill Clinton), Edwin Meese (Attorney General under President Ronald Reagan), Jennifer Palmieri (White House Communication Director under President Barack Obama) businessman and inventor Charles R. Schwab, and New England Patriots quarterback Tom Brady. There are also 3 current JSA alumni serving in Congress: Mark Takano, Derek Kilmer, and Zoe Lofgren.

Other notable alumni 
 Christopher Cabaldon (Former Mayor, West Sacramento)
 Lanhee Chen (David and Diane Steffy Research Fellow, Hoover Institution and Former Policy Director, Mitt Romney presidential campaign, 2012)
 Andrei Cherny (Former Chair, Arizona Democratic Party)
 Fred Dutton (Chief of Staff, Governor Pat Brown)
 Michael Edelstein (President, International Television Production at NBC Universal)
 Dario Frommer (Former Majority Leader, California State Assembly)
 Eric Garcetti (Mayor, Los Angeles)
 Chris Gethard (comedian)
Beth Labson Freeman (Judge, United States District Court for the Northern District of California)
 Ted Lempert (Former member, California State Assembly and President, Children NOW)
 Bill Lockyer (California State Treasurer)
 Zoe Lofgren (Member, United States House of Representatives)
 Frank Mankiewicz (Press Campaign Director, George McGovern's Presidential campaign and former president, NPR)
 Greil Marcus (Rock Historian and Critic)
 Bob Mathias (Former Olympian and United States Congressman)
 Stanley Mazor (Designer of the first microprocessor)
 Norman Mineta (Former Secretary of Commerce and Secretary of Transportation)
 Darcy A. Olsen (President & CEO, The Goldwater Institute)
 Nicholas Petris (Former Member, California State Senate)
 Joe Simitian (Former Member, California State Senate)
 Mark Takano (United States Congressman)
 Ethan Watters (Author, Urban Tribez and co-founder, San Francisco Writers Grotto)

Structure 

The JSA consists of 10 states which correspond roughly to the geographic territories in the United States: the Arizona State, Mid-Atlantic State, Midwest State, Northeast State, Northern California State, Ohio River Valley State, Pacific Northwest State, Southeast State, Southern California State, and the Texas State. Each state is broken into one or more regions. If a state contracts below a certain operational level, the Council of Governors may vote to make the state a territory. The Council may also break states into multiple territories if they become too large to be effectively managed.

The sponsoring JSAF is a non-profit organization with an adult board of directors, trustees and paid staff.  The JSA receives administrative and programming support from the JSF.

Arizona State
The Arizona State comprises Arizona, New Mexico, and Colorado.

Current Governor:

•Maritza Roberts-Padilla BASIS Tucson North 2022–2023

Current Lieutenant Governor:

•Jude Poirier BASIS Tucson North 2022–2023

Mid-Atlantic State

The Mid-Atlantic State is composed of chapters from New Jersey, Pennsylvania, Maryland, Delaware, Virginia, and North Carolina. The Mid-Atlantic State is divided into the New Jersey Region (NJ) and the South Atlantic District (PA, MD, DE, VA, NC). The New Jersey Region is the most populated JSA region in the nation. Winter Congress is held in Arlington, Virginia, while the Spring and Fall State Conventions rotate between Parsippany, NJ and Woodbridge, NJ.

The Mid-Atlantic state had the largest number of voters in its 2022 election with over 2,000 participants.

Current Governor:

Rishi Jayakumar (West Windsor-Plainsboro High School North) 2022–2023

Current Lieutenant Governor:

Rithvik Mattipalli (Middlesex County Academy) 2022–2023

Current Speaker of the State Assembly:

Rohan Chandorkar (West Windsor-Plainsboro High School North) 2023–2023

Current South Atlantic Executive:

Noah Sher (Charles E. Smith Jewish Day School) 2023–2023

Current NJR Mayor:

Aarush Chhiber (Middlesex County Academy) 2023–2023

Current NJR Vice Mayor:

Yena Choe (Leonia High School) 2022–2023

Midwest State
The Midwest State encompasses the Illinois, Wisconsin, Michigan, Minnesota, North Dakota, South Dakota, Nebraska, Iowa, Kansas, and Missouri.

Current Governor: Ariel Shifrin (Vernon Hills High School) 2022-2023

Current LTG: Meg Gurram (Naperville North High School) 2022-2023

Northeast State
The Northeast is composed of chapters from Maine, Vermont, New Hampshire, Massachusetts, Rhode Island, Connecticut and New York. It boasts two regions, the New England Region (VT, NH, MA, RI) and the Empire Constitution Region (CT, NY).

Winter Congress is held in Arlington, Virginia, while the Spring and Fall State Conventions rotate between Boston, MA, Stamford, CT, and Providence, RI.

Current Governor: 
Kavya Desikan (Westford Academy) 2019–2020
Current LTG: 
William Feng (The Cambridge School of Weston) 2019–2020
Current ECR Mayor: 
Evan Kindseth (Amity Regional High School) 2019–2020
Current ECR Vice Mayor: 
Scott Weinstein (John Jay High School) 2019–2020
Current NER Mayor: 
Zachary Roberts (Westford Academy) 2019–2020
Current NER Vice Mayor: 
Caroline Riemer (Westford Academy) 2019–2020

Northern California State
NorCal is composed of chapters from California, Nevada, and Utah. It has four regions: the Golden Gate Region, the Central Valley Region, the Greater California Region, and the East Bay Region. NorCal is the oldest JSA state in the country, dating back to the founding of the organization in 1934.

Fall and Spring State are held in San Jose, CA and Winter State is held in Sacramento, CA.

Current Governor:

 Georgia Laganiere (Maria Carrillo High School) 2022–2023

Current Lieutenant Governor:

 Ellie Acosta (Maria Carrillo High School) 2022–2023

Current Speaker of the Council of Chapter Presidents:

 Rose Cromwell (Maria Carrillo High School) 2022–2023

Ohio River Valley State
The Ohio River Valley (ORV) includes chapters from Ohio, Indiana, Kentucky, West Virginia, and Tennessee. The state contains the Southwest District and North Central District. Fall State is held annually in Columbus, OH. Winter Congress is held annually in Washington, D.C. Spring State is held annually in Florence, KY. The ORV government is composed of a program director, a governor, a lieutenant governor and a cabinet. The cabinet contains ten different departments, with 10 directors and 20 specialists.

Current Governor: Aneetej Arora (Dublin Coffman High School) 2021–2022

Current Lieutenant Governor: Suvan Dometti (Dublin Coffman High School) 2021–2022

Pacific Northwest State
The Pacific Northwest has chapters from Washington, Oregon, Idaho, Montana, and Wyoming. The state has three regions: the Great Pacific Region (western WA), the Inland Empire Region (eastern WA, ID, MT, WY), and the Oregon Region (OR).

Current Governor: Riya Saripalli

Current Lieutenant Governor: Alex Lim (International School of Beaverton)

Southeast State
The Southeast state comprises chapters from South Carolina, Georgia, Alabama, Mississippi, and Florida.

Southern California State
The Southern California state comprises southern California and small parts of Nevada.

Current Governor:

 Aashna Rana (Orange County School of the Arts) 2022–2023

Current Lieutenant Governor:

 Gary Shirikchian (Rose and Alex Pilibos Armenian School) 2022–2023

Current Speaker of the Assembly:

 Elisa Booth (La Canada High School) 2022–2023

It is organized into three regions:

Angeles Region
The Angeles Region consists of greater and Downtown Los Angeles, all the way to West Hollywood. It is the largest region of Southern California.

Southern Empire Region
The Southern Empire Region consists of Orange County and Anaheim.

Channel Islands Region
The Channel Islands Region consists of coastal regions and Santa Barbara.

Texas State 
The Texas State compromises of Texas, Arkansas, Oklahoma, and Louisiana. Their Fall and Spring State conventions are held in Houston, Texas, but pre-pandemic, their Fall State conventions were hosted at the Texas Capitol Building in Austin, Texas. Texas State's Winter Congress is hosted in also hosted in Houston, but was previously located in Washington, D.C. with the Mid-Atlantic State. Their state elected officials include the following:

Texas Junior State Governor:
Kaitlyn Hou (Plano Senior High School) 2022–2023
Chief of Staff: Kalina Peneva (Bellaire High School) 

Texas Junior State Lieutenant Governor:
Mitsuki Jiang (Bellaire High School) 2022–2023
Chief of Staff: Kyle Letterer (Plano West Senior High School) 

Texas Junior State Speaker of the House:
Ferzine Sanjana (Saint Mary's Hall) 2022–2023
Chief of Staff: Brandy Xie (Texas Academy of Mathematics and Science)

The Texas Junior State is organized into two regions and two counties, with mayors serving as leaders of regions and administrators serving as leaders of counties:

Gulf Coast Region (GCR)
The Gulf Coast Region consists of the Gulf Coast of Texas, with Houston serving as the center of the region. The 2022–2023 Gulf Coast Mayor is Dorothy Okoro.

Alamo Capitol Region (ACR)
The Alamo Capitol Region consists of the center of Texas, encompassing cities such as Austin and San Antonio. The 2022–2023 Alamo Capitol Mayor is Khushi Patel.

Panhandle Metroplex County (PMC)
The Panhandle Metroplex County consists of the Northeast quadrant of Texas, encompassing cities such as Dallas, Plano, and Fort Worth. The 2022–2023 Panhandle Metroplex County Administrator is Gabriel Bo.

Rio Grande County (RGC)
The Rio Grande County consists of the Southern tip of Texas, encompassing cities such as McAllen and Edinburg. The 2021–2022 Rio Grande County Administrator is Lauren Marquez.

JSA events

Fall and Spring State conventions 
 Fall State and Spring State are statewide overnight conventions at regional hotels and convention centers.  Both consist of debates, thought talks, and special activities, including political fairs and a casual dance. Fall State is one night, students typically arrive at the hotel on a Saturday and return home the following day.  Spring State, by comparison, usually takes place over three days, students arriving at the hotel on a Friday and returning on Sunday.  At this longer spring convention JSA members in attendance elect regional leaders for the upcoming year.  Both Fall and Spring State conventions are highlighted by prestigious keynote speakers, with past speakers including Pat Robertson, Ralph Nader, Colin Powell, Jahana Hayes, Tom Malinowski, Fareed Zakaria and Joe Trippi.

Winter Congress convention 
Winter Congress is structured similar to the United States Congress: students are divided into Senate and House of Representative committees. Student delegates pass bills in committees and then in floor sessions of the Senate and House. If a bill passes both houses, it becomes JSA law.

Regional conferences 
There are also smaller, regional conferences and chapter-conferences ("chapter-cons") which occur on a local level.  Regionals are run by the Mayors and Vice-Mayors of Regions along with the Regional Cabinet members that they appoint.  Chapter-cons are usually hosted by chapters at individual schools and are not officially JSA-sponsored events.

Elected positions and cabinet 
As a student-run organization, each JSA state holds elections yearly at the Spring State conventions to elect student elected officials who serve one-year terms. Each state elects a Governor and Lieutenant Governor, as well as various other offices that differ from state to state. These officials each appoint a small cabinet that helps them run the organization by completing tasks such as organizing convention logistics, writing debates, producing publicity materials, founding new chapters, and running websites. There is also a National Cabinet appointed by the Council of Governors. JSA officials and cabinet members are typically extremely dedicated to JSA, and often spend many hours per week doing their jobs.

National Cabinet 
JSA's National Cabinet works closely with JSAF, the Council of Governors, and state directors to implement directives across all JSA states. The National Cabinet is appointed by the Council of Governors each year, and standardize programs across the states. The 2022-2023 National Cabinet consists of:

2022-2023 National Chief of Staff: 

 Hannah C. (Mid-Atlantic State)

2022-2023 National Director of Activism:

 Tazia M. (Southern California State)

2022-2023 National Director of Activities:

 Anirudh H. (Mid-Atlantic State)

2022-2023 National Director of Debate:

 Christopher L. (Texas State)

2022-2023 National Director of Expansion:

 Rohan L. (Mid-Atlantic State)

2022-2023 National Director of Fundraising:

 Parth J. (Mid-Atlantic State)

2022-2023 National Director of Grant Writing:

 Joven T. (Southern California State)

2022-2023 National Director of Publicity:

 Brian L. (Mid-Atlantic State)

2022-2023 National Director of Technology;

 Amol B. (Mid-Atlantic State)

Summer programs 
After the school year is over, JSA and JSF offer numerous summer programs. The biggest programs, which are held at major universities, are Summer Schools, which are conducted by the Junior Statesmen Foundation and offer students an opportunity to study local, state, or national government at an advanced level. These programs are meant to prepare young leaders for active participation in public affairs.

These programs, at which students take a full semester of two courses over three or four weeks, for which they can receive high school credit, take place at Stanford, Georgetown, Princeton, and Beijing. Along with debate and regular classes (including Advanced Placement and Law Classes), students participate in a vigorous Speaker's Program in which notable speakers talk about current issues to the students. Past speakers have included Mike McCurry, Andy Card, Ben Bernanke, Lee H. Hamilton, Norman Mineta, Joe Trippi, Dennis Kucinich, Chuck Hagel, Katie Couric, Brian Williams, Geraldine Ferraro, John Kerry, Harry Reid, Barack Obama, Ted Rall, George H. W. Bush, Condoleezza Rice, Ed Meese, Bernie Sanders, Brian Williams, Karl Rove, Sebastian Gorka, and Sarah Huckabee Sanders.

Summer institutes are also held in different regions, such as the summer symposium of Arizona State, Stanford, UCLA, Princeton University  and University of Texas.  These events are four- to five-days long and venture into politics, world studies, history, national security and discussions of current events. Princeton's event is nicknamed "Princetitute." These events used to be known as symposia.

Every summer, the newly elected governors each choose a select few from their states or territories to attend the Montezuma National Leadership Summit (affectionately known as "Zuma").  The summit is held in early-to-mid August at Presentation Center in Los Gatos, California, the former site of the Montezuma Mountain School where JSA was founded in 1934.  Students who are selected to attend this summit learn more about the history and national dynamics of JSA. Being selected for attendance is considered one of the ultimate JSA honors, and many of the students that attend lead future years of the Junior State.  Subsequently, two or three students are selected out of class to become a National Montezuma Foundation Student Advisor, working with the Junior State Foundation to preside over budget and funding allocations for the National Montezuma Summit.

References

External links
 Official website

Youth organizations based in the United States
Political organizations based in the United States
Youth model government
501(c)(3) organizations
Burlingame, California
Organizations based in the San Francisco Bay Area
1934 establishments in the United States
Organizations established in 1934